Jamjar.com, also known as Jamjar (and formally known as Jamjarcars), is an online car buying comparison service. The Jamjar web domain and name were acquired by motoring business Grapevine Europe Ltd in 2015. Prior to Grapevine's acquisition, the Jamjarcars brand was owned by the Royal Bank of Scotland Group and, later, Lombard Vehicle Management. Under RBS, the company was an online car leasing company, established in 2000 as jamjar.com and operated in conjunction with Dixon Motor Holdings. After Dixon Motor Holdings was put into administration in 2007 the Jamjar business changed to a car finance brokerage, providing loans from Lombard Vehicle Management. Jamjarcars ceased providing new leases in September 2009.

Jamjarcars under Dixon Motor Holdings (2000-2007) 
Jamjarcars was established in 2000 by RBS and operated in conjunction with Dixon Motor Holdings, a car dealership acquired by RBS subsidiary Lombard Vehicle Management in 2002. Until 2007, the company was an online car retailer focusing on consumer sales.

RBS put Dixon Motor Holdings into administration in 2007, removing jamjar.com's capacity to operate as an online car retailer. Lombard Vehicle Management took control of the company and the business to a vehicle financing brokerage.

Jamjarcars under Lombard Vehicle Management (2007-2009) 
Lombard Vehicle Management, the vehicle financing branch of RBS, took control of Jamjarcars in 2007, following the decision to put Dixon Motor Holdings into administration. Under the management of LVM, jamjar.com was used as an online car finance broker.

In 2009, Lombard made the decision to stop using brokers, instead changing to a direct to end user business model. This decision led to the closure of Jamjarcars, as Lombard no longer had any need for its brokerage service.

Jamjar.com under Grapevine Europe Ltd. (2015-present) 
The director of Grapevine Europe Ltd., Andrew King, purchased the rights to the Jamjarcars name in 2015, also acquiring the jamjar.com domain that the previous business had used. There is no connection between the existing Jamjarcars business and the former RBS-owned business.

Nottinghamshire-based Grapevine Europe specialises in buying and selling motor vehicles. It was founded by Andrew King in 2009 as a parent company for Sell Your Jamjar. Sell Your Jamjar was the first online car buying business to exist in the UK. The closure of RBS’ Jamjarcars business presented Grapevine Europe with the opportunity to develop their Jamjar brand and their online car buying offering.

With King's purchase of jamjar.com and the Jamjarcars name, Grapevine developed an online car buyer comparison service named Jamjar. The business now allows vehicle owners to compare offers for their vehicle from online buying services.

References

Royal Bank of Scotland
Financial services companies established in 2000
Retail companies established in 2000
Internet properties established in 2000
Leasing companies